Reinoud, or Reinoud van Brederode may refer to the following members of the Van Brederode family:

 Reinoud I van Brederode (1336–1390), 6th lord of Brederode
 Reinoud II van Brederode (1415–1473), 9th lord of Brederode
 Reinoud III van Brederode (1492–1556), 11th lord of Brederode
 Reinoud IV van Brederode (1520–1584), lord of Asten, Netherlands and father of Walraven III van Brederode
 Reinoud van Brederode (1567–1633), lord of Veenhuizen, North Holland and Wesenberg (Rakvere), Estonia